Apoda is a genus of slug caterpillar moths in the family Limacodidae. There are about 10 described species in Apoda.

Species
These 10 species belong to the genus Apoda.
 Apoda avellana Linnaeus, 1758
 Apoda biguttata (Packard, 1864) (shagreened slug moth)
 Apoda christophi Graeser, 1888
 Apoda cretacea Holland, 1893
 Apoda creticum Rebel, 1906
 Apoda latomia Harvey, 1875 (western rectilinea slug moth)
 Apoda limacodes (Hufnagel, 1766)
 Apoda maxima Dyar, 1927
 Apoda rectilinea Grote & Robinson, 1868 (rectilinea slug moth)
 Apoda y-inversa Packard, 1864 (inverted Y slug moth)

References

Further reading

 
 
 
 
 
 
 

Limacodidae
Moth genera